The Battle of Riga may refer to:
 Battle of Riga (1203), an engagement of the Livonian Crusade
 Battle of Riga (1215), an engagement of the Livonian Crusade
 Battle of the Gulf of Riga (1915), a naval battle of World War I
 Battle of Riga (1917), a land battle of the World War I
 Battle of Jugla, one part of the 1917 battle
 Battle of Riga (1919) during the Latvian War of Independence

See also
 Riga Offensive (1944), a Red Army offensive which drove the German army from Riga in World War II